The Los Coyotes LPGA Classic was a golf tournament on the LPGA Tour from 1989 to 1992. It was played at the Los Coyotes Country Club in Buena Park, California.

Winners
Los Coyotes LPGA Classic
1992 Nancy Scranton

MBS LPGA Classic
1991 Pat Bradley
1990 Nancy Lopez

Nippon Travel-MBS Classic
1989 Nancy Lopez

References

External links
Los Coyotes Country Club

Former LPGA Tour events
Golf in California
Women's sports in California